Vincent Castiglia (born April 8, 1982 in Brooklyn, New York) is an American Painter and Tattoo Artist. He paints figurative paintings with metaphysical and often nightmarish subject matter depicting various, uncensored stations of the Human Condition, exclusively in human blood (iron oxide) on paper. Castiglia tattoos exclusively in black and grey with a concentration in Realism, receiving numerous awards and has been published by countless news outlets and Art, and Lifestyle publications including various television appearances, internationally and domestically.

Painting
Castiglia's paintings are monochromatic tableaux examining life, death, and the human condition. Dominant work themes include the symbiosis of birth and death, the transience of human beings, and the pitfalls of mortality, while simultaneously illustrating themes of hope, survival, love and the common thread off non-material phenomena, or Mysticism, 'interpenetrating" his body of work. The images themselves, as he sees them, form as crystallizations of Castiglia's experiences, freed from the psyche. Through his work the viewer is forced into a re-acquaintance with life and urgency that might not otherwise take place. While many surrealists cite fantasy or dreams as their inspiration, Castiglia's Visionary art is connected to a life story which is highly allegorical. 

Castiglia is the first American artist to receive a solo exhibition invitation from Oscar Award-winning artist, H.R. Giger, to exhibit at the H.R. Giger Museum, in Gruyeres, Switzerland. Remedy for the Living, the 1st solo exhibition of paintings by Vincent Castiglia opened at the H.R. Giger Museum Gallery on November 1, 2008, and closed in April 2009.

Castiglia's works on paper have been exhibited internationally and hang in many distinguished collections. In 2009, "Gravity", one of his most celebrated works of 2006, was acquired by rock musician, Gregg Allman.

Recently, in 2016, Castiglia painted a custom ESP electric guitar for Gary Holt of both Slayer and Exodus. This is a fully functional piece of art that is often played onstage by Gary. The Guitar, titled, "Lucifer," was painted exclusively in 18 viles of Gary's own blood. Shortly thereafter, Slayer also commissioned Castiglia to paint them a poster for their farewell tour, "Farewell".

As decomposition and decay are so much a part of life as birth and growth, one can see this cycle occur in Castiglia's work. Castiglia's art confronts the innate fear of these natural phenomena and exposes their reality by the precise rendering of these conventionally intangible facts. Contradiction and struggle give the work a life of its own. His unique visual language is stripped of all but the essential elements.

Contemporary Art critics have compared Castiglia's work to old masters such as Michelangelo, the contemporary expressionist Francis Bacon, as well as conceptual artist Damien Hirst whose explicit portrayals of death are in similar form.

Tattooing
Starting in 2000, after working many jobs in the service industry, Private Sanitation being his employment last prior to Tattooing, Castiglia began tattooing with an informal mentorship and friendship with New York City Tattoo pioneer Michelangelo ("Mikey") Perfetto in Brooklyn. Having had a lifelong affinity for Art, after becoming accustomed to new tools and equipment and a self-imposed, staggeringly 'militant' work ethic (free-handing/hand-drawing every tattoo on skin, no matter how complex the design, including H.R. Giger reproductions) for the first year of tattooing. Castiglia soon emerged with full features in the nation's top Tattoo and Art Publications, as well as international press recognition for his unique style of Realism and Surrealism. By invitation, Castiglia has attended numerous international and domestic tattoo conventions, conducted painting seminars, and has an annual convention roster he maintains.

Album art
In 2009, Vincent painted album art for Triptykon's 2010 debut release, Eparistera Daimones. The group is founded by former Hellhammer / Celtic Frost singer and guitarist Tom Gabriel Fischer. The album's art is an amalgamation of works by HR Giger (cover art), Vincent Castiglia (interior art), and Triptykon on "Eparistera Daimones", which conceptually is understood to form a creative triptych in itself.

Film
2010 Horror-Slasher Film, Savage County, features a specially created painting by Vincent Castiglia as its movie poster. The painting depicts the three murderers in the film.

2018 Bloodlines: The Art and Life of Vincent Castiglia
A biography about Vincent in relation to his artwork.

Painting Medium
Castiglia's use of only blood and water on paper as well the technique by which it is applied to his canvases achieves more tonal range and textural possibilities than the rusty sepia one associates with blood stains. His skillful handling of this iron rich pigment is a significant component, as is his personal vision and disciplined rendering of his subject matter. The viewer is not only allowed to see into the figure, but also through it, into a deeper psychological world.

The first colors used by humans were red, iron oxide (hematite, a form of red ochre) and black. The word hematite, the source of many iron oxide pigments, is derived from the Greek word, "haima", meaning blood, and because of its symbolic and spiritual significance, early man coveted this color.

References

External links
 
Official site
Vincent Castiglia Interview
Movie about Castiglia's art and life
Gary Holts Custom ESP Guitar painted by Castiglia

Living people
Visionary artists
People from Brooklyn
American tattoo artists
1982 births
Artists from New York City
Tattoo artists
Artists from Brooklyn